"Pour Me" is a debut song recorded by American country music group Trick Pony.  It was released in October 2000 as the first single from their debut album Trick Pony.  The song was written by group members Keith Burns, Ira Dean and Heidi Newfield with Rory Waters Beighley and Sammy Harp Wedlock.

Track listing
CD Single

Music video
The music video was directed by Peter Zavadil and premiered in late 2000.

Chart performance
"Pour Me" debuted at number 74 on the U.S. Billboard Hot Country Songs chart for the week of October 21, 2000.

Year-end charts

References

2000 debut singles
2000 songs
Trick Pony songs
Warner Records singles
Music videos directed by Peter Zavadil
Songs written by Heidi Newfield